Laura River may refer to:

 Laura River (Romania)
 Laura River (Queensland)
 Laura River (Western Australia)

See also 
 Laura (disambiguation)